Hilary Cottam  is an innovator, author and social entrepreneur.

Cottam is the author of Radical Help: how we can remake the relationships between us and revolutionise the Welfare State. The book has been described as ‘mind-shifting’ and '[addressing] the questions we ought to be facing’.

A renowned thinker and innovator on the reform of the welfare state, Cottam has designed and led large scale systemic innovation projects focusing on: employment, the prevention and management of chronic conditions, elder care, prison reform and family services. Working with communities across Britain and in Europe Cottam has worked to collaboratively design approaches that have changed thousands of lives. Transformation is achieved through a model that emphasises human relationships supported by technology.

Cottam argues that we need a social revolution: deep socio-economic change driven by technology combined with the demand to address climate change, requires us to think, work and organise in radical new ways. Her writing and practical collaborations around the theme of a fifth Social Revolution are at the core of her current work.

Cottam is credited as the pioneer of social design and was named UK Designer of the Year in 2005 for her ground-breaking methodology which fuses anthropology, psychoanalysis, business tools and a design process.

Work
In the 1990s, Cottam worked with UNICEF and the World Bank. As an urban poverty specialist at the World Bank, she worked in Southern Africa to develop a radical participatory approach to assessing and reducing urban poverty.

Returning to the UK in 1998, Cottam set up two award-winning social enterprises: School Works Ltd (now the British Council for School Environments) which was ranked within Britain's top 100 creative companies and the Do Tank Ltd.

Between 2001 and 2006 Cottam was a Director at the UK Design Council where she started the RED Unit and a new programme of work on the transformation of public services.  Working with IDEO CEO Colin Burns, Cottam developed Transformation Design a pioneering approach in which design methods were applied to social change.

In 2006 Cottam started Participle, a 10 year experiment to develop and test exemplars of a 21st century welfare state. Participle’s work garnered a world-wide reputation both for the innovative new working methodologies used and for the social impact of a series of new social enterprises and services (new approaches to ageing, family services, youth services, chronic disease and unemployment).

Cottam has worked as an advisor to governments in Europe, Latin America and Africa and has sat on the advisory board of not for profit organisations and a FTSE 100 company.  She is a regular commentator on social issues in the mainstream media.

Education
Cottam was educated at Oxford University (Modern History B.A Hons) and Sussex University (M.Phil. with Distinction in International Studies) and holds a doctorate from the Open University in social sciences.

Cottam has undertaken post-doctoral study at Harvard and the LSE. She is currently a visiting professor at UCL.

Recognition, honours and awards
In 2005, Cottam was named UK Designer of the Year with her blueprints that combine elements of architecture and policy for schools, health services, and prisons. In 2007 the World Economic Forum named Cottam as a Young Global Leader in recognition of her work on social change.

Her work has been featured in numerous design books (most recently Hello World) and in exhibitions in the UK Design Council, the Smithsonian, and most recently as one of 8 designers feature in the 100 year celebrations of the Museum of Applied Arts, Vienna (MAK).

Cottam was appointed Officer of the Order of the British Empire (OBE) in the 2020 New Year Honours for services to the British welfare state.

Academic appointments
Cottam is a Visiting Professor at the UCL Institute for Innovation and Public Purpose. UCL is London’s leading multi-disciplinary university.

Selected publications
Radical Help 
Relational Welfare 
Beveridge 4.0
A Tale of Two Witches: re-weaving a social Europe in Europa 28: Visions for the Future of Europe, Comma Press, 2020 https://www.hayfestival.com/europa28/europa28.aspx?skinid=24

References

External links
Hilary Cottam's personal website
Hilary Cottam's TED talk (Sept. 2015)

1965 births
Living people
Alumni of the University of Oxford
World Bank people
UNICEF people
British officials of the United Nations
Officers of the Order of the British Empire